Peter Macintosh Firth (born 27 October 1953) is an English actor. He is best known for his role as Sir Harry Pearce in the BBC One programme Spooks; he is the only actor to have appeared in every episode of the programme's ten-series lifespan. He has given many other television and film performances, most notably as Alan Strang in Equus (1977), earning both a Golden Globe Award and an Academy Award nomination for the role.

Early life, family and education 
Firth was born in Bradford, West Riding of Yorkshire, England, the son of publicans Mavis (née Hudson) and Eric Macintosh Firth. He attended Hanson School in Bradford.

Early career

Child actor
Firth was a leading child actor by the middle of 1969, having starred in the first series of The Flaxton Boys as Archie Weekes and then the following year in the series Here Come the Double Deckers, both of which featured child actors in the leading roles. Firth played Scooper, the leader of the gang. In 1972 he also starred in the ITV (London Weekend Television) series The Adventures of Black Beauty, episode "The Runaway", playing David Abbott.

In July 1973, Firth appeared at Laurence Olivier's National Theatre, starring in the stage version of Peter Shaffer's play Equus as a teenager being treated by a psychiatrist, and in October 1974 repeated the role in the Broadway production, receiving a Tony Award nomination for his performance as Alan Strang.

Firth starred in an episode of The Protectors, titled “Implicado”, first screened in November 1973. He played Stephen Douglas, an innocent young man, alongside Patrick Mower as a drug-dealer.

Next stage of career
Firth's first major role as an adult was the title part in a BBC Television Play of the Month adaptation of Oscar Wilde's novel The Picture of Dorian Gray (1976). The script was based on a stage adaptation by John Osborne, and also starred Jeremy Brett and John Gielgud. That same year saw the release of the World War I film Aces High which featured Firth as the inexperienced RFC pilot Lt. Stephen Croft.

Firth played the lead role in the film adaptation of Henry Fielding's Joseph Andrews (1977). That same year he starred with Richard Burton in the film adaptation of Equus. The film was only a moderate box-office success, but earned Firth a nomination for the Academy Award for Best Supporting Actor and a Golden Globe Award in the same category. Further film work quickly followed, most notably Roman Polanski's Tess (1979).

Film 
Other film work has included roles in Diamonds on Wheels (1973); When You Comin' Back, Red Ryder? (1979); Lifeforce (1985); Letter to Brezhnev (1985); Northanger Abbey (1987), playing Henry Tilney; The Hunt for Red October (1990) playing the Soviet political officer Ivan Putin murdered early in the film; White Angel (1993), playing mild-mannered dentist Leslie Steckler; Amistad (1997) playing the strongly anti-slavery Captain Fitzgerald of the Royal Navy; Mighty Joe Young (1998); Pearl Harbor (2001); and The Greatest Game Ever Played (2005), playing Lord Northcliffe.

Television 
Along with his film career, Firth has continued to appear in various television productions, with several notable credits in various high-profile dramas. He starred in two science-fiction episodes of the BBC's Play for Today anthology series as the eponymous time-traveller in the romantic The Flipside of Dominick Hide (1980), and its sequel, Another Flip for Dominick (1982). Firth also had a starring role in Tales Of The Unexpected in 1981. In 1994, in the Fourth Series of Heartbeat, he played Dr. Radcliffe who partnered with Dr. Rowan (Niamh Cusack) in Whitby. He also portrayed the Emperor Vespasian in "The Jewish Revolt" episode of the BBC series Ancient Rome: The Rise and Fall of an Empire.

For many years he had played a primary role as senior MI5 officer Harry Pearce in the BBC's popular spy drama series Spooks (2002–2011), and played Fred Hoyle in Hawking, a BBC dramatisation of the early career of Stephen Hawking.
He was also Snaith in the three-part series South Riding in 2011. Firth has also appeared on American and Canadian television, on programmes such as Law & Order: Special Victims Unit and Total Recall 2070, as well as in television films such as The Incident starring Walter Matthau.

In 2014, Firth played the part of the character Andrew Rawlins in Undeniable, a two-part series made for the ITV network. In 2015 he played Jacob Marley in four episodes of the BBC television series Dickensian.

In 2016, he played the part of Ernest Augustus, Duke of Cumberland and King of Hanover in ITV's drama series Victoria.
In 2018, he played Milos Borisovich, a Belarusian drug lord.

Audiobooks 
Firth is also a narrator of audiobooks. He has been responsible for performances reading Pat Barker's Regeneration, The Ghost Road and The Eye in the Door, Suspicion by Robert McCrum, Maurice by E. M. Forster, Brave New World by Aldous Huxley, Sebastian Faulks' Birdsong and Thomas Hardy's Tess of the d'Urbervilles.

Honours and awards
On 17 July 2009, he was awarded an honorary degree by the University of Bradford as a Doctor of Letters for his services to acting, having been nominated by the School of Computing, Informatics & Media; he received his award during the school's degree ceremony.

Personal life
Firth lodged with Peter Shaffer throughout the Broadway run of Equus, in a father-son relationship.

Filmography

Film

Television

Video games

Audiobooks

References

External links 
 
 
 

1953 births
20th-century English male actors
21st-century English male actors
Male actors from Bradford
Audiobook narrators
Best Supporting Actor Golden Globe (film) winners
English male child actors
English male film actors
English male television actors
English male stage actors
English male voice actors
Living people